The 2022 Uzbekistan Cup is the 30th season of the annual Uzbekistan Cup, the knockout football cup competition of Uzbekistan. The cup winner qualifies for a place in the 2023–24 AFC Champions League.

Nasaf are the defending champions.

First qualifying round
The draw for the first qualifying round was held on 19 March 2022.

Second qualifying round
The draw for the second qualifying round was held on 23 March 2022. The seven teams which advance from the first qualifying round and Denov who has received a bye for first round play in this round.

Third qualifying round
The draw for the third qualifying round was held on 25 March 2022. The four teams which advance from the second qualifying round play in this round.

Group stage
The winners and runners-up of each group and the two best third-placed teams among all groups advanced to the knockout stage..

Group A

Group B

Group D

Group E

Group F

Group G

Ranking of third-placed teams

Knockout stage
In the knockout stage, each tie will be played as a single match. The winners, runners-up and the two best third-placed teams from the group stage will join the two participating clubs in the group stage of the 2022 AFC Champions League, Pakhtakor and Nasaf.

Qualified Teams 

Pot 1
Pakhtakor
Nasaf
Navbahor
AGMK
FK Kokand 1912
Sogdiana
Turon
Bunyodkor

Pot 2
Qizilqum
Lokomotiv
Mash'al
FK Andijon
Olympic
Metallurg
Surkhon
Sho'rtan Gʻuzor

Round of 16
The draw will held on 28 April 2022. For the draw the winners of the group will be in a separate pot, as well as with clubs that participate in the group stage of the AFC Champions League. The matches have been scheduled from August 21 to 25.

Quarter-finals
The matches have been scheduled from September 2 to 3.

Semi-finals
The matches have been scheduled from October 13 to 14.

Final

The cup winner qualifies for a place in the 2023–24 AFC Champions League.

References

External links

Uzbek Cup Results, (Russian)
Soccerway.com

Cup
Uzbekistan
Uzbekistan Cup